Christian Brothers College, Cork (CBC Cork, colloquially known as Christians) is a fee-paying school under the trusteeship of the Edmund Rice Schools Trust in Cork, Ireland.

Their sister school in Dublin is CBC Monkstown.

History 

In the mid 19th-century, the Vincentian Fathers maintained a seminary at Saint Patrick's Place in Cork, known as the Cork Diocesan Seminary. In 1888 a new seminary with residential accommodation was completed at Farranferris, and the Vincentian ecclesiastical students transferred there.

The then bishop of Cork, Most Rev. Dr O'Callaghan, invited the Christian Brothers to take charge of the St Patrick's Place establishment.

From the beginning, CBC was principally involved in preparing pupils for university entry, and operated on St Patrick's Place for one hundred years.

Recent development 
Marking the centenary in 1988, the college moved from its original site to a new location, one hundred metres away, atop Sidney Hill.

In 1994, the school appointed its first lay principal, Dr. Laurence Jordan, who held the position until 2018. In the same period (1996-1998) modernisation works took place on the sports facilities at Lansdowne, and an extension to the college complex itself included improved dining facilities and the creation of a complex for sixth year students. By 2008, the school's annual fees were €3,100 for first year and €2,850 for subsequent years.

Though the Christian Brothers retain a presence on the Board of Management, as Trustees, CBC is now staffed entirely by lay teachers, and is recognised as one of Ireland's leading educational establishments at secondary level. In the 2016 Sunday Times Schools League Table, CBC was listed 13th among the country's top boys schools.

As of January 2019, CBC had over 1000 students in the college, with over 900 at Secondary Level, and approximately 150 at Primary Level in the Preparatory School. The principal of the college (both secondary and preparatory) is Mr. David Lordon.

Extracurricular activities 

The school is one of Cork's "rugby union nurseries" and have won the Munster Schools' Senior Cup thirty times - a record unbeaten by any other school in the competition. The most recent Senior Cup title wins were in 2009 (in a final against Rockwell College), and in 2016 (in a close final against Crescent College). The college's main rivals are Presentation Brothers College (as the two main fee paying all-boys schools in Cork, both share similar histories, student bases, and sporting and academic traditions). A number of CBC past pupils have been members of the Munster Rugby squad, including Darragh Hurley, Tomás O'Leary, and Donncha O'Callaghan.

The school also participates in other extracurricular activities, including debating, charitable activities, basketball and others. The school also participates in other sports, including soccer (association football) and GAA (Gaelic football and hurling) - with CBC winning the Junior Cup for soccer in 2003 and 2008, and reaching the final of the Dr. Harty Cup (hurling) in 2019.

Through several fundraising efforts, including the annual Christmas appeal, CBC supports charities including SHARE, Saint Vincent de Paul, HOPE, Trócaire and Concern. Among the school's charitable activities is the "Zambia Immersion Project", which involves students travelling to Zambia to observe and assist with development work.

Notable alumni 

 Peter Barry, Minister for Foreign Affairs (1982–1987), Tánaiste (1987)
 J. Kevin Boland, RC prelate bishop of Savannah
 Mark Cagney, TV and radio broadcaster
 Hugh Coveney, Minister for the Marine (1994–1995), Minister for Defence (1994–1995)
 Aloys Fleischmann, composer, professor of music
 Darragh Hurley, Munster rugby player
 Donal Lenihan, former Ireland rugby union captain
 David Meyler, Irish international footballer
 Frank Murphy, former Munster rugby player and Leicester Tigers, current Connacht Rugby player
Noel Murphy (Sr.), Irish Rugby Union international, Munster Rugby and British and Irish Lions team member
Noel Murphy (Jr.), Irish Rugby Union international, Munster Rugby and British and Irish Lions team member
 Donncha O'Callaghan, Irish Rugby Union international, Munster Rugby and British and Irish Lions team member
 Tomás O'Leary, Irish Rugby Union international and Munster Rugby and British and Irish Lions team member
 Duncan Williams, Munster Rugby player
 James Coughlan, Munster Rugby and Section Paloise player

References

External links 
Official site - CBC Cork

Boys' schools in the Republic of Ireland
Secondary schools in County Cork
Congregation of Christian Brothers secondary schools in the Republic of Ireland
Educational institutions established in 1888
Education in Cork (city)
Private schools in the Republic of Ireland
Buildings and structures in Cork (city)
1888 establishments in Ireland